James Roday Rodriguez (born James David Rodriguez, April 4, 1976) is an American actor, director, and screenwriter. He is best known for starring on the USA Network series Psych as hyper-observant consultant detective and fake psychic Shawn Spencer. He currently stars in A Million Little Things, which debuted in 2018.

Early life 
Rodriguez was born in San Antonio, Texas, as James David Rodriguez. He attended Taft High School in San Antonio. His father, James "Jim" Rodriguez, is of Mexican descent, and his mother, Deborah Collins, is of English, Irish, and Scottish ancestry. Rodriguez's father is a retired Air Force Master Sergeant and used to be the regional catering manager of Taco Cabana.

At New York University's Experimental Theatre Wing, Rodriguez studied theatre and earned a bachelor's degree in fine arts. At the age of 22, he selected the professional name James Roday. In a July 2020 interview, Rodriguez explained the decision was mainly driven by producers and casting directors feeling his Caucasian appearance clashed with his Spanish-Latino family name. The characters he read for up until that point either were not written with a Latino background or required a non-white "Mexican" appearance. In order to book his first job, he legally changed his middle name, David, to Roday (from an Anton Chekhov play), and omitted Rodriguez from his screen name. In the same interview, he stated regret that he "sold out my heritage in about 15 seconds" and announced that going forward he was going to use his full legal name of James Roday Rodriguez.

Career 
Rodriguez started his acting career starring in various theatrical productions, including Three Sisters, A Respectable Wedding, and Severity's Mistress. He took on leading roles in Sexual Perversity in Chicago and Extinction which he produced with his theatre company Red Dog Squadron, for which he also directed the play Greedy and wrote and directed the one-act play Sustenance. His most recent foray onto the stage was in December 2016, when he starred in the New York production of  White Rabbit Red Rabbit by Iranian playwright Nassim Soleimanpour.

His big screen debut was in the 1999 film Coming Soon alongside Ryan Reynolds and fellow debutant Ashton Kutcher. Other early film credits include the 2003 film Rolling Kansas and the 2005 film adaptation of The Dukes Of Hazzard. Behind the scenes, he and writing partners Todd Harthan and James DeMonaco wrote the screenplay for the 2006 film Skinwalkers. The team also worked on a script for the film adaptation of the video game Driver.

Rodriguez's television credits include starring roles in 2001's First Years and NBC's Miss Match in 2003. His big break came on July 7, 2006, with the series premiere of USA Network's original series Psych. Airing following the season premiere of USA's other comedic success, Monk, it was the highest-rated scripted basic cable TV show premiere of 2006. Psych ran for eight seasons until 2014.

After Psych ended, Rodriguez starred in various pilots and independent films, most notably Pushing Dead by independent filmmaker Tom E. Brown which accumulated a slew of awards at film festivals all over the country. At the same time, he began focusing on his work behind the camera as a director, writer and producer. Rodriguez has since directed episodes for Battle Creek, Rush Hour, Rosewood, Blood Drive and The Resident and developed, wrote, and directed the pilots Shoot The Moon for USA and Quest For Truth for E!.

Rodriguez directed his first feature film, Gravy, in 2013, written by him and Todd Harthan. He co-wrote (once again with Todd Harthan) and directed his second film Treehouse as part of Hulu's monthly horror movie anthology Into The Dark, which aired in March 2019.

In 2017, Rodriguez returned to his most famous role as he starred in and served as executive producer on Psych: The Movie, which he also co-wrote with Psychs series creator Steve Franks, aired in December 2017. A sequel, Psych 2: Lassie Come Home was officially announced on February 14, 2019. It was filmed in Vancouver in March and April of that year and debuted July 15, 2020 on NBCUniversal's streaming service Peacock. Lassie Come Home was the first project that featured his full legal name, James Roday Rodriguez.

Rodriguez is currently starring as Gary Mendez on ABC's dramedy A Million Little Things. The fourth season premiered on September 22, 2021.

Rodriguez reprised his role as Shawn Spencer once again in Psych 3: This Is Gus, which was filmed in June 2021. He is also the co-writer and co-executive producer. It was released on Peacock on November 18, 2021.

Rodriguez will also be lending his voice in the upcoming animated feature  Night of the Animated Dead, an adaptation of George A. Romero's Night of the Living Dead.

Personal life 
Rodriguez is the co-artistic director of the Red Dog Squadron, a Los Angeles theater company he co-founded with Brad Raider. In 2012, Rodriguez and Black Dahlia artistic director Matt Shakman bought the El Centro Theatre and started a long process of renovations with the intent of reopening it under its original name Circle Theatre. In a newsletter from August 2018, Raider and Rodriguez announced that they had to resell the theatre in early 2018.

Rodriguez dated his Psych co-star Maggie Lawson from 2006 to 2014, coinciding with the series run.

Filmography

Actor

Director

Writer

Awards and nominations

References

External links 

 
 USA Network biography of James Roday Rodriguez
 ABC Network biography of James Roday Rodriguez

1976 births
American male film actors
American male screenwriters
American male stage actors
American male television actors
American television directors
Television producers from Texas
American television writers
Living people
New York University alumni
Male actors from San Antonio
Male actors from Texas
Hispanic and Latino American male actors
20th-century American male actors
21st-century American male actors
American male actors of Mexican descent
American male television writers
Screenwriters from Texas
People from San Antonio